Amblyseius passiflorae is a species of mite in the family Phytoseiidae.

References

passiflorae
Articles created by Qbugbot
Animals described in 1974